John Wu may refer to:

John Wu Shi-zhen (1921–2014), Chinese Roman Catholic archbishop
John Baptist Wu (1925–2002), bishop of Hong Kong's Catholic church
John Ching Hsiung Wu (1899–1986), jurist and author
John Wu (politician) (born 1969), Taiwanese politician

See also
John Woo (disambiguation)